Habib Ben Azzabi (born 6 August 1937) is a Tunisian modern pentathlete. He competed at the 1960 Summer Olympics.

References

1937 births
Living people
Tunisian male modern pentathletes
Olympic modern pentathletes of Tunisia
Modern pentathletes at the 1960 Summer Olympics
Sportspeople from Tunis
20th-century Tunisian people